Guette or Guetté is a French surname.

List of people with the surname 

 Clémence Guetté (born 1991), French politician
 Dumas Guette (born 1952), Colombian former footballer
 Henriette Guette, retired French slalom canoeist

See also 

 Guetta
 Sainte-Colombe-sur-Guette

Surnames
Surnames of French origin